The Diocese of Thanh Hóa is a Roman Catholic diocese of Vietnam. The bishop since 2018 is Joseph Nguyễn Đức Cường. Of the three million persons living in its area about 3% are Roman Catholics.

The diocese covers an area of 11,168 km², and is a suffragan diocese of the Archdiocese of Hà Nôi. It was erected on May 7, 1932 as a Vicariate Apostolic. On November 24, 1960 it was elevated to a diocese.

Immaculate Conception Cathedral in Thanh Hoa city has been assigned as the Cathedral of the diocese.

References

External links
catholic-hierarchy.org

Thanh Hóa
Thanh Hoa
Christian organizations established in 1932
Roman Catholic dioceses and prelatures established in the 20th century
Thanh Hoa, Roman Catholic Diocese of
1932 establishments in Vietnam